Pearl Thompson (born 8 November 1957 as Paul Stephen Thompson) is an English musician and artist. Thompson is best known as a member of the English alternative rock band The Cure from 1983–1994 and 2006–2010, credited as Porl Thompson and playing mainly guitar with occasional keyboards and saxophone. During and after The Cure, Thompson was active with a few other bands and projects but has since retired from music and turned to painting.

Career 
Thompson was a member (alongside Robert Smith, Michael Dempsey and Lol Tolhurst) of the Easy Cure, which was a precursor to The Cure. Thompson left Easy Cure to go to art college; his style did not mesh well with Smith's approach to songwriting. Thompson went on to become a member of The Exotic Pandas and occasionally played with The Glove, a collaboration between Smith and Steven Severin of Siouxsie and the Banshees. Thompson rejoined his bandmates in The Cure in 1983, initially playing saxophone on several tracks that would appear on the group's 1984 album, The Top. During the Top tour, he expanded his instrumental contributions to include keyboard as well as guitar, also continuing to perform with The Glove when they appeared on television.  Over time, Thompson became known principally as a guitarist in the band, and is sometimes seen as the most technically proficient musician in the band's history after Reeves Gabrels.

In 1994, Thompson left The Cure to play with Jimmy Page and Robert Plant of Led Zeppelin during the Page and Plant tour of 1995. He also played with Babacar, a band formed by long-time Cure drummer Boris Williams. Later, Thompson formed another project called Quietly Torn. Thompson continued working with Plant, joining the singer's group for the 2002 release Dreamland.

In June 2005 Thompson rejoined The Cure, and was with the band for the recording of the live DVD The Cure: Festival 2005; for the recording of the band's 13th studio album, 4:13 Dream; and for the band's 2007–2008 4Tour.

In 2007, Schecter Guitars released a Pearl Thompson Signature model featuring graphics by the British artist Kev Grey. The guitar was featured in the book 108 Rock Star Guitars by photographer Lisa S. Johnson.

Thompson is featured on the album Callus by Gonjasufi, released in August 2016.

As an artist 
Thompson and background designer Andy Vella were the co-founders of Parched Art. Parched Art produced many of the record sleeves found on The Cure's albums. The most recognisable record sleeves were primarily drawn, painted, or photographed by Thompson.

In 2002, Thompson also had an exhibition of paintings in Cornwall, UK, and Canada titled "100% SKY".

In March 2015, Thompson's first US painting exhibition of abstract landscape paintings was held at Mr. MusicHead Art Gallery on Sunset Boulevard in Los Angeles, California. The exhibition was entitled "...Through the eyes of birds". Remote Malibu canyons inspired the work and desert landscapes. Also in 2015, Thompson announced that he would focus his endeavors on his artwork.

Personal life 
Close friends had long used "Pearl" as a nickname. Thompson's first name was legally changed to "Pearl" in 2011.

Pearl is noted for being reclusive and private. From his early time in The Cure Thompson dated Janet Smith, the younger sister of Robert Smith. Thompson and Smith are married and have four children.

Discography 

The Cure
 Three Imaginary Boys (1979) (Disc 2 of 2004 deluxe issue only)
 The Top (1984)
 Concert (1984)
 The Cure Live in Japan (1984) VHS
 The Head on the Door (1985)
 Standing on a Beach (1986)
 The Cure in Orange (1986), VHS
 Kiss Me, Kiss Me, Kiss Me (1987)
 Disintegration (1989)
 Mixed Up (1990)
 Entreat (1990)
 Wish (1992)
 Show (1993)
 Paris (1993)
 Galore (1997)
 Greatest Hits (2001)
 Festival 2005 (2005), DVD
 4:13 Dream (2008)

Gonjasufi
 Callus (2016)
 Mandela Effect (2017)

Page and Plant
 No Quarter: Jimmy Page and Robert Plant Unledded (1994)
Robert Plant
 Dreamland (2002)
Shelleyan Orphan
 Humroot (1992)
Babacar
 Babacar (1998)

References

External links 

 Official site

The Cure members
1957 births
Living people
English rock guitarists
English new wave musicians
English multi-instrumentalists
People from Wimbledon, London